Hart County is the name of two counties in the United States:

 Hart County, Georgia 
 Hart County, Kentucky